"The Cost" is the tenth episode of the first season of the HBO original series The Wire. The episode was written by David Simon from a story by David Simon and Ed Burns and was directed by Brad Anderson. It originally aired on August 11, 2002.

Plot

Bubbles, clean for three days, meets with Walon at a park. Walon gives Bubbles some frank advice while telling him about how he became infected with HIV and infected his girlfriend. Avon and Stringer meet with Wee-Bey and tell him to contact Omar to negotiate a truce. Stringer convinces Avon to take a step back from the game and insulate himself further from his organization. Avon gives up his pager so that his subordinates will have to contact him through Stringer. McNulty visits Phelan, who seems to have lost his stomach for the Barksdale investigation. Pearlman later informs McNulty that Phelan has been cast off the mayor's re-election ticket.

D'Angelo ignores Donette as she plans out a home for their family, and walks out without giving her the money she is asking for. He waits for Shardene outside of 
Orlando's strip club, but she refuses to talk to him. Freamon traces the Barksdale stash to a payphone in Pimlico. Every time a resupply is needed, they page the same number and the return call comes from the same payphone. Carver and Sydnor are the only detectives available to watch the phone, as Herc is on a training course for the week. The next day, Santangelo identifies Little Man using the tower phone, and Sydnor soon finds the respondent. Freamon instructs Sydnor to follow the resupply man and tracks him to a suburban house. Later, Freamon organizes Sydnor and Prez to surveil the house as garbage men.

Orlando is arrested by narcotics cops when he tries to buy cocaine from an undercover officer, Troy Wiggins. He gives them Avon's name to try to avoid his charge and the detail gets involved. When Orlando is transferred to county jail, he is identified by Marvin Browning, a Barksdale crew member serving time, who phones in Orlando's whereabouts. Levy visits Orlando, but only to take his name off the club's liquor license; now that he has a record, Avon is severing their ties. Daniels suggests they could use Orlando in a buy-bust to move up the ladder. In a meeting with Burrell and Major Raymond Foerster, Daniels makes a case for waiting, but Burrell insists on a buy-bust. After working out that Wallace is squatting in the projects and tapping power from a vacant apartment, McNulty bribes Officer Bobby Brown and his partner with a case of beer and some crab cakes to wait for him to return home. Greggs informs McNulty that Omar has contacted her and needs medical care for his shoulder wound.

Wallace gives up Stringer, Wee-Bey, and several other tower soldiers in Brandon's murder. Afterward, Daniels and Pearlman decide to place him with his grandmother on the Eastern Shore, as there are no funds for protective custody. Later, Daniels drives Wallace to his new home and notices that he is in withdrawal. McNulty discovers that Elena has organized an emergency hearing to limit his visitation rights. The judge dismisses the suggestion and asks them to deal with the problem themselves. McNulty tries to convince Elena that he loves his family, but she reminds him that she has photographs of him meeting with Pearlman. While going out drinking with Cheryl and some friends, Greggs is asked how she knew she wanted to be a cop and tells the story of an adrenaline-fueled arrest. Cheryl looks uncomfortable throughout, but when Greggs acknowledges her misgivings, the two kiss.

Omar meets with Stringer to discuss a truce under Proposition Joe's supervision. Despite Omar wearing a wire, the detectives come away with little new information. Stringer does not deny a link to Brandon's murder but is quick to shield Avon's name from the discussion. When Stringer does not reject Omar's demand for $5,000, he realizes the truce is a trap and boards a bus to New York City. McNulty sees him off and asks him to keep in touch. Avon, Stringer, and Wee-Bey later discuss the meeting, while Shardene tries to listen in with little success. Bubbles meets with Greggs and asks for her help getting a place to stay clean; she agrees to give him some money the following day. With no other option, Daniels organizes a buy-bust and Greggs is sent in undercover as Orlando's girlfriend. Savino meets with Orlando and they drive to another location, with Greggs sitting in the back. However, the bust goes awry when Savino abandons the car and two gunmen open fire on the car, killing Orlando and wounding Greggs in the neck and chest.

Production

Title reference
The title refers to the injury to Greggs, the cost of the investigation. Also, it refers to the cost of Bubbles's newfound sobriety, as well as the cost of what he could lose (a home with his estranged sister).

Epigraph

Greggs uses the quotation when describing her experience of a difficult physical arrest where she received nonchalant backup and realized she was meant to be a police officer.

Music
The song playing in the car with Orlando and Greggs is "Hater Players" by Black Star. The song playing when D'Angelo accosts Shardene outside Orlando's is "I'll Go Crazy" by James Brown from the album Live at the Apollo. The song playing while Shardene tries to listen in on Wee-Bey, Avon, and Stringer is Ms. Fat Booty by Black Star-member Mos Def.

Non-fiction elements
In his meeting with Omar, Stringer uses the phrase "truth be told" which is also the title of the guide book on the series.

When Omar leaves at the bus station and says goodbye to McNulty, he is asked about New York City.  He replies 'There must be something happening, it's too big a town', a line lifted from the Steve Earle song 'New York City'

Credits

Guest stars

References

External links
"The Cost" at HBO.com

The Wire (season 1) episodes
2002 American television episodes
Television episodes written by David Simon